Vice Admiral George Napier Tomlin, CMG, MVO (25 July 1875 – 7 May 1947) was a British naval officer.

Private life
In 1911, when Commander George Napier Tomlin was with Medina, his engagement was announced in The Sketch to Miss Violet Seymour Osborne.

Career
George Napier Tomlin went straight to sea from HMS Britannia, and was in two actions ashore on the west coast of Africa as a 17-year-old midshipman. He was promoted to lieutenant on 31 December 1896, and in March 1900 was appointed to HMS Rainbow, in charge of navigation.

In 1911–1912 he navigated , with King George V and Queen Mary on board, to India and back for the 1911 Delhi Durbar, for which he received the MVO.  After the Armistice he was given command of an Allied squadron in the Black Sea, which was responsible for seeing that the terms of the Armistice were carried out.  For his services in this connection, he was awarded the CMG.  Subsequently he commanded the battleship HMS Canada, built for the Chilean Navy, and later handed over to them.  His experience during that transaction led to his being "lent" to the Chilean Navy for two years to found a Naval War College after a period on the staff of the corresponding organization at Greenwich.  He commanded Malaya in the Mediterranean, was promoted to rear-admiral in 1927 and lent to the Egyptian Government for seven years with the titles of Admiral and Pasha.  He retired in 1934.

His service record is as follows:

Medals
Tomlin's medals were put up for sale in 2007, and described as follows:
"A highly important group of Medals and Orders to Rear Admiral George Napier Tomlin (1875-1947), comprising CMG, MVO East and West Africa Medal Benin River 1894, Gambia 1894 (G.N. TOMLIN. MID RN HMS RALEIGH), 1914-15 Trio MID CAPTAIN RN, Delhi Burbar Medal 1911, Chilean Order "AL MERITO" 2nd Class; Order of Leopold II (Grand Officer), Order of the Gown of Italy (Grand Officer (neck badge and breast star), Order of the Nile 2nd Class (neck badge and breast star), together with companion group of miniatures mounted as worn, his naval sword and naval dirk and a copy photograph. Captain George Napier Tomlin HMS Liverpool Commanding Allied Squadron in support of the White Army during the Russian Civil War. Known to have been in Touapse and Novorossisk during November 1918".

Footnotes

1875 births
1947 deaths
Royal Navy vice admirals
Royal Navy officers of World War I
Members of the Royal Victorian Order
Companions of the Order of St Michael and St George
Grand Officers of the Order of Leopold II